A fair green is a space that hosts fairs.

Fair Green or Fairgreen may refer to:

England
 Fair Green (Middleton), in Norfolk
 Fair Green (Mitcham), in south London
 Fair Green (Sawbridgeworth), in Hertfordshire

Northern Ireland
 Fair Green (Ballymena), in County Antrim
 Fairgreen (Omagh), in County Tyrone

Republic of Ireland
 Fair Green (Mullingar), in Leinster
 Fairgreen (Galway), in Connacht

See also
 Fairground (disambiguation)
 green